DJI is a leading manufacturer of drones based in China.

DJI or Dji may also refer to:

 Dji River, river in the Central African Republic
 Djibouti, country located in the Horn of Africa
 Dow Jones Industrial Average, stock market index
 Dow Jones Indexes, joint venture that produces stock market indexes
 Master Dji (1961–1994), Haitian rapper